Hereford and South Herefordshire is a constituency of the House of Commons of the UK Parliament. It comprises the city of Hereford and most of south Herefordshire and is currently represented by Jesse Norman of the Conservative Party.

Constituency profile
The seat is centred on Hereford and is mostly rural on the border with Wales. Fruit production including for ciders remains a significant sector. Residents' wealth and health are around average for the UK.

Members of Parliament

Boundaries

Following a review of parliamentary representation in Herefordshire by the Boundary Commission for England, which took effect at the 2010 general election, the county was allocated two seats.  The Hereford and South Herefordshire constituency largely replaced the former Hereford seat, with the remainder of the county covered by the North Herefordshire seat. As well as the city of Hereford, the seat contains the settlements of Golden Valley, Pontrilas and Ross-on-Wye.

The constituency is formed from the following electoral wards in the Herefordshire Council authority area:

Aylestone Hill, Belmont Rural, Birch, Bobblestock, Central, College, Dinedor Hill, Eign Hill, Golden Valley North, Golden Valley South, Greyfriars, Hinton and Hunderton, Holmer, Kerne Bridge, Kings Acre, Llangarron, Newton Farm, Penyard, Red Hill, Ross East, Ross North, Ross West, Saxon Gate, Stoney Street, Tupsley, Whitecross, Widemarsh and Wormside.

Elections

Elections in the 2010s

See also 
List of parliamentary constituencies in Herefordshire and Worcestershire

Notes

References

Politics of Hereford
Politics of Herefordshire
Parliamentary constituencies in the West Midlands (region)
Constituencies of the Parliament of the United Kingdom established in 2010